Eno Essien is a Nigerian technology entrepreneur and Chief Executive Officer at Rheytrak Limited, a Vehicle Tracking and Recovery company, which she started in 2007. In 2012, she was nominated as the Future Awards Entrepreneur of the Year (Technology) and the only female CEO in the Vehicle Tracking Industry in Nigeria.

References 

Living people
Date of birth missing (living people)
Year of birth missing (living people)
Nigerian chief executives
Nigerian businesspeople
21st-century Nigerian businesspeople
Nigerian company founders